Haunted Poland is a 2011 horror film in the found footage genre, pieced together from amateur footage. The film was produced by Maso & Co Productions. Told cinéma vérité-style, Haunted Poland depicts the contents of recorded tape filmed by a couple Ewelyn (Ewelina Lukaszewska), and Pau (Pau Masó) who visited Poland to meet and visit family. However, our duo soon find themselves disturbed by all manner of strange phenomena upon visiting the girl's hometown where she once played with a ouija board. The film  premiered at the AIFF on November 20, 2011.

A sequel, Haunted Poland: The Origins, has been announced.

Plot
In 2011, a couple living in America, Ewelina and Pau, travel to Poland to meet the girl's family. As the film goes by, strange phenomena occurs, but her reluctant "non-believing" boyfriend, just pokes fun at her instead of supporting her, while she is actually having a hard time.

Cast
 Ewelina Lukaszewska as Ewelyn
 Pau Masó as Pau
 Irene González as Irene
 Dominik Lukszewski as Ewelyn's brother

Production
Filming began in July 2011 and lasted seven days.

Release
The film will premiere at the 2011 American International Film Festival (AIFF) on November 20 as well as the Sundance Film Festival.

Reception
Haunted Poland has garnered negative reviews and the director/actor has been accused of "borrowing liberally from Paranormal Activity". In addition, the first teaser for the film holds a 90% negative bar rate on YouTube. The director released a statement on Dread Central to stop the negativity the trailer created "Haunted Poland was meant to be an 'experimental' project, says director Masó" and continues "This is not a Hollywood film with a budget of 20 million dollars. This film was completely shot on a consumer camera, with an estimate budget of 1000.00$." Additionally, the actor insisted later on, that the film was independent by making this statement "This movie is a no-budget and will be approximately 90 minutes".

Awards and nominations

In October 2011 Haunted Poland won "Best Movie/Documentary/Video/Script featuring  Religiosus/Supernatural theme" on the American International Film Festival 2011.

References

External links
 
 
 
 "New Take on First Person Horror in Haunted Poland" on Bloody Disgusting
 "Haunted Poland – (2012) Clip and 1 sheet" on Horror News
 "New Haunted Poland (Nawiedzona Polska) Trailer Creeps Online" on Dread Central
 "Przyjechał poznać rodzinę ukochanej, przeżyje horror w teaserze Nawiedzonej Polski" on Filmweb
 "First Details, Poster & Trailer For Polish Horror Flick Haunted Poland" in the JoBlo.com
 “Haunted Poland”  In: The Łódź Post

2011 films
2010s Polish-language films
2010s English-language films
English-language Polish films
2011 horror films
Films directed by Pau Masó
Films set in Europe
Films set in Poland
Films shot in Poland
Found footage films
Polish horror films
2011 multilingual films
Polish multilingual films